Ystrad Einion or Ystrad-Einion is a small village in the  community of Ysgubor-y-coed, Ceredigion, Wales, which is 78.7 miles (126.7 km) from Cardiff and 175.4 miles (282.2 km) from London.

Ystrad Einion is represented in the Senedd by Elin Jones (Plaid Cymru) and is part of the Ceredigion constituency in the House of Commons.

Zinc, silver, lead and copper were mined at Ystrad Einion, which is located in Cwm Einion (Artist's Valley).

References

See also
List of localities in Wales by population

Villages in Ceredigion